Peter Michael Butler  (31 May 1901 – 24 September 1995) was a New Zealand seaman, trade unionist, communist and local politician.

Biography

Early life
He was born in Whiteabbey, County Antrim, Ireland, on 31 May 1901. Butler was largely self-educated, yet proved an effective speaker, writer and organiser later in life. At age 16 Butler joined the Mercantile Marine reserve, serving mostly in the North Sea for the remainder of World War I. After the war Butler became one of the leaders of a militant faction in the seamen's union and briefly courted communist ideology, which he rejected strongly later in life.

During the late 1920s and early 1930s (the duration of the Great Depression), Butler served as secretary of the Wellington Builders' and General Labourers' Union. On 18 December 1930, Peter Butler married Doris Annie Sevina Cooper at St Paul's Cathedral Church in Wellington (an Anglican church despite Butler being a committed Catholic). Later, he and Doris reaffirmed their marriage vows at a Catholic church in Johnsonville on 28 April 1938.

Political career
In 1928, he was an organiser for Bob Semple in his successful election campaign in Wellington East for the Labour Party. Butler had better success in local government. He was elected to the Wellington City Council at the 1933 election, only after special votes were counted, and was to remain a councillor until 1941. At the 1944 election he was nominated to be Labour's candidate for the mayoralty, one of five candidates he was not selected with Labour Party president James Roberts prevailing.

In 1953, Butler was awarded the Queen Elizabeth II Coronation Medal. He attempted to make political comeback in the 1960s, standing several times for the council on the Labour ticket in 1965, 1968 and a 1969 by-election. While polling strongly on all occasions he never managed to regain a seat.

Later life
Butler retired from his union positions in 1972. In the 1985 Queen's Birthday Honours, Butler was appointed a Commander of the Order of the British Empire, for services to the trade union movement. He died on 24 September 1995 and was buried at Whenua Tapu Cemetery near Pukerua Bay.

References

1901 births
1995 deaths
New Zealand trade unionists
Irish emigrants to New Zealand (before 1923)
New Zealand communists
People from County Antrim
Wellington City Councillors
New Zealand Commanders of the Order of the British Empire
Unsuccessful candidates in the 1935 New Zealand general election
Unsuccessful candidates in the 1931 New Zealand general election
New Zealand Labour Party politicians
Burials at Whenua Tapu Cemetery
British Merchant Service personnel of World War I